The 2012 World Junior Table Tennis Championships were held in Hyderabad, India, from 9 to 16 December 2012. It was organised by the  Table Tennis Federation of India (TTFI) under the auspices and authority of the International Table Tennis Federation (ITTF).

Medal summary

Events

Medal table

See also

2012 World Team Table Tennis Championships

References

World Junior Table Tennis Championships
World Junior Table Tennis Championships
World Junior Table Tennis Championships
World Junior Table Tennis Championships
Table tennis competitions in India
International sports competitions hosted by India
World Junior Table Tennis Championships